The Central Wheatbelt Football League is an Australian rules football competition in the Wheatbelt region of Western Australia.

History

The Central Wheatbelt Football League (CWFL) was formed at the end of the 1967 football season following a merger of the Dampier Football Association and the Koorda-Wyalkatchem Football Association.
The Dampier Football Association (1913–1967) had clubs that included Bencubbin, Kununoppin, Mukinbudin. Nungarin, Trayning, & Yelbeni. 

The Koorda-Wyalkatchem Football Association (1958-1967) was an amalgamation of the Koorda Football Association (1929-1957) which had clubs included Gabbin, Cadoux, Booralaming and the Wyalkatchem Football Association (1923-1957) with clubs included Benjabbering, Korrelocking, Wyalkatchem and Yorkrakine

Current clubs

Former clubs

Grand final results

Ladders

2006 ladder

2007 ladder

2008 ladder

2009 ladder

2010 ladder

2011 ladder

2012 ladder

2013 ladder

2014 ladder

2015 ladder

2016 ladder

2017 ladder

2018 ladder

2019 ladder

References

Australian rules football competitions in Western Australia